Brian Louie Donowa (born 24 September 1964) is an English former professional footballer who played as a winger. He made nearly 400 appearances for a variety of clubs in the Football League and also played in several other European countries.

Playing career
Born in Ipswich, Suffolk, Donowa began his career with Norwich City. He was a member of the Norwich youth team that won the FA Youth Cup in 1983 and the side that won the League Cup in 1985. He was capped by England under-21s during his time at Carrow Road. In 1985–86 Donowa spent time out on loan at Stoke City where he played five times scoring once which came in a 3–2 win away at Millwall. In March 1986 he signed for Spanish club Deportivo de La Coruña for a fee of £50,000. After four years at the Estadio Riazor he played for a short time at Dutch side Willem II.

In 1989, he returned to England and played for Ipswich Town, Bristol City, Birmingham City, Burnley, Crystal Palace, Shrewsbury Town, Walsall and Peterborough United. He then played in Scotland for Ayr United and Finland with Inter Turku.

Career Statistics
Source:

Honours
with Norwich City
 FA Youth Cup winner 1983
 League Cup winner 1985
with Birmingham City
 Football League Second Division (level 3) champions 1994–95
 Football League Trophy winners 1995

References

Canary Citizens by Mark Davage, John Eastwood, Kevin Platt, published by Jarrold Publishing, (2001),

External links
 
 Career Information at ex-canaries.co.uk
 

1964 births
Living people
Sportspeople from Ipswich
English footballers
English expatriate footballers
England under-21 international footballers
Black British sportspeople
Association football wingers
Norwich City F.C. players
Stoke City F.C. players
Deportivo de La Coruña players
Willem II (football club) players
Ipswich Town F.C. players
Bristol City F.C. players
Birmingham City F.C. players
Burnley F.C. players
Crystal Palace F.C. players
Shrewsbury Town F.C. players
Walsall F.C. players
Peterborough United F.C. players
Ayr United F.C. players
Turun Palloseura footballers
Boston United F.C. players
Tamworth F.C. players
Expatriate footballers in Spain
Expatriate footballers in the Netherlands
Expatriate footballers in Finland
English Football League players
Eredivisie players
Segunda División players